Rafael Perivoskin, also known as Ralph Perry, is a professional poker player known primarily for calling all-in against Antanas Guoga (Tony G) with king-jack, which resulted in Ralph feeling Tony's power and having to ride his bike home. He is originally from Russia and has been playing professionally since 1992.

In 2006, Perry represented Russia at the inaugural Intercontinental Poker Championship and reached the semi-finals, during which he was the target of some much-publicised needling by Tony G.

On 18 July 2006, Perry won his first World Series of Poker bracelet, along with over $200,000, in the $1,500 pot limit Omaha event. He dedicated his bracelet to his wife Merri.

In 2006, Perry was placed 17th in Card Player's Player of the Year awards.

Perry finished third in the 2002 WSOP Main Event.

As of 2016, Perry's live tournament earnings exceeded $2,880,000. His 21 cashes at the WSOP account for $1,573,541 of those winnings.

Notes

Russian poker players
World Series of Poker bracelet winners
Living people
Year of birth missing (living people)